Mumtaz Khan Akbar is the founder and owner of the Mumtaz brand. He was born in Mera Qadir, Azad Kashmir, Pakistan on 10 February 1959 and joined his family in Britain in 1972. Mumtaz Khan has since become one of the richest men in Yorkshire and Lancashire. (2016)

Mumtaz Khan is the Governor of the first bank to open in Azad Kashmir. He is also known for his charitable work throughout the UK and Pakistan. In 2012 he received two doctorates. One from the University of Bradford and the other from Leeds Metropolitan University.

Mumtaz Khan is the founder of Halal Baby Food and Mumtaz group of Industries.

Mumtaz group of Industries have now built a factory in Bradford, Spain, Malaysia and Switzerland. Mumtaz has recently said in an interview that the Bradford factory is his way of giving back to Bradford. Due to his disqualification as a director Mumtaz is no longer involved with any UK company, Mumtaz Khan Akbar formerly owned Mumtaz Restaurant, Mumtaz Food Industries and Mumtaz Group.

See also
 Mumtaz Group

References 

Pakistani businesspeople
Pakistani emigrants to the United Kingdom
British businesspeople of Pakistani descent
1959 births
Living people